Ariel Esteban Salas Sanzana (born 9 October 1976) is a Chilean former professional footballer who played as a goalkeeper.

Club career
Salas came to Colo-Colo at the age of 9 and made his professional debut in a match against Everton played in the Estadio Monumental in 1995. After having no chances to play for Colo-Colo behind Daniel Morón and Marcelo Ramírez, in 1997 he moved to Magallanes. In total, he played for six clubs both in Chile and abroad.

International career
He played for Chile in both the 1993 FIFA U17 World Championship in Japan, where Chile reached the third place, and the 1995 FIFA U20 Championship in Qatar. In addition, he took part of Chile squad in both the 1993 South American U17 Championship and the 1995 South American U20 Championship.

At under-23 level, he represented Chile in the 1996 Pre-Olympic Tournament.

Personal life

He has worked as PE teacher and sports consultant in both schools and municipalities as well as the football coach of La Misión School from Calera de Tango.

He has a filled pasties and sandwiches shop called D'Primera (D'First).

Honours

Club
Colo-Colo
 Chilean Primera División (2): 1993, 1996
 Copa Chile (2): 1994, 1996

International
Chile U17
 FIFA U-17 World Cup Third place: 1993

References

External links
 
 Ariel Salas at playmakerstats.com (English version of ceroacero.es)

1976 births
Living people
Footballers from Santiago
Chilean footballers
Chile youth international footballers
Chile under-20 international footballers
Chilean expatriate footballers
Association football goalkeepers
Colo-Colo footballers
Deportes Magallanes footballers
Magallanes footballers
C.D. Antofagasta footballers
Deportes La Serena footballers
Deportes Ovalle footballers
Chilean Primera División players
Primera B de Chile players
Chilean football managers